TNN Motorsports HardCore Heat ("Great Buggy" in early development), known in Japan and Europe as , is an off-road racing video game for the Dreamcast, developed and published by CRI, and published by ASC Games and Sega in 1999.

Vehicles
 Matador
 Reaper
 HammerHead
 Avalanche
 Dune Hopper
 Girth 2000
 Coyote
 LE-2001

Reception

The game received mixed reviews according to the review aggregation website GameRankings. Adam Pavlacka of NextGen said, "If you absolutely must play an off-road racing game, go ahead and rent this one. If you want to buy, bide your time and wait for Sega Rally 2, a much better game all around." In Japan, Famitsu gave it a score of 26 out of 40.

The Japanese version was praised for its visuals, but criticized for flawed controls; in the American release, the control issues were mostly fixed.

References

External links
 

1999 video games
Dreamcast games
Dreamcast-only games
Off-road racing video games
Sega video games
Video games developed in Japan
ASC Games games
Multiplayer and single-player video games
CRI Middleware games